Short Trips – Volume 1 is a Big Finish Productions audiobook based on the long-running British science fiction television series Doctor Who.

After the Big Finish Short Trips books ended the range was restarted in talking book format, now read by actors with music and sound effects.

Notes
Colin Baker is the only actor to portray the Doctor who has written a Doctor Who story and had it successfully produced.  The story, "The Wings of a Butterfly," was originally written by Baker for an anthology, "Missing Pieces," published in 2002 as a charity compilation in both the UK and US.  Baker also previously wrote The Age of Chaos, a Doctor Who comic book, in 1994.

External links 
 Short Trips Volume 1

Big Finish Short Trips
Doctor Who spin-offs